Folarin L. Ogunsola (born 23 June 1997) is a Gambian swimmer. He competed in the 50 m freestyle and 50 m backstroke events (the latter of which he did not start) at the 2011 World Aquatics Championships and in the 50 m freestyle and 50 m butterfly events at the 2013 World Aquatics Championships.

References

Living people
Gambian male swimmers
1997 births
20th-century Gambian people
21st-century Gambian people